Särklass A is a sailing class in Finland with about 30 boats built between 1936 and 1952.

See also
Hai
Särklass C

References

Development sailing classes
Keelboats